Michael Price is an Emmy Award  winning English composer and pianist. Prior to establishing himself as a composer, he held a number of roles within the TV & film music field such as producer, arranger and music editor, much of which whilst working alongside acclaimed film score composer Michael Kamen.

Personal life

The son of physics and biology teachers, Price studied music at school, before starting his music career on the Tonmeister course at Surrey University, where he won the PRS composition prize in 1990.

Early career

After writing a number of scores for contemporary dance in his early 20s, he became Musical Director of DNA Dance and Music, whose projects included the arts council funded chamber opera "All the Garden Gold", based on the life of William Morris and the Pre-Raphaelite movement.

Film and television

Prices's first film work was in 1996, when he was invited by Michael Kamen to orchestrate and program electronic sounds for the Paramount film Event Horizon. This led to a 5-year working relationship encompassing a number of film scores in London, LA and Prague, and concerts in Berlin, New York, San Francisco and Geneva. Following the production of the score to Band of Brothers, Price was approached to music edit on The Fellowship of the Ring for New Line Cinema.

Prior to work as a composer, Price worked as a music editor with films including Peter Jackson's The Lord of the Rings trilogy, Richard Curtis' Love Actually, Bridget Jones: The Edge Of Reason and Nanny McPhee. As a music editor, Michael has been nominated for 4 MPSE Golden Reel Awards, winning in 2001 for Lord of the Rings: The Fellowship of the Ring.

Price has, to date scored 31 films, increasingly focussing on contemporary drama productions. Recent highlights include his partnership with acclaimed Welsh director Craig Roberts, composing the scores for Just Jim in 2015 and Eternal Beauty in 2019. In television, recent successes include Age Before Beauty, Soulmates (TV series) and all four series of ITV's hit crime drama Unforgotten, the fourth of which premiered on 22 February 2021.

A frequent collaborator, Price often works with fellow composer David Arnold, most notably co-composing the music for all 13 episodes of Sherlock, the BBC television series created by Steven Moffat and Mark Gatiss, that premièred on BBC1 on 25 July 2010. In 2015, they also co-composed the music for ITV's Jekyll and Hyde television series which premièred in October 2015. Furthermore, Price has supported Arnold on film scores including Edgar Wright's Hot Fuzz, The Inbetweeners Movie and The Inbetweeners 2'.

In addition to composing for Zentropa's Dommeren and Slingshot Studios' Sugarhouse he scored two documentaries for producer and director Alfonso Cuarón; The Possibility of Hope, and Naomi Klein's The Shock Doctrine, both in 2007. Price met Cuarón when he scored additional music for the Academy Award winning feature Children of Men, working with Cuarón as music editor.

Solo career 

Michael's first work to be released outside of the realms of film and television was a collection of four string quartet pieces 'A Stillness' which was released on Erased Tapes in 2012. Entanglement, his debut album (also on Erased Tapes) was released in 2015, fulfilled Michael's long-term desire to explore new musical territories, featuring Michael on the piano, with the addition of cello, soprano voice, string orchestra, modular synth, tape effects and electronics.

This was followed by Diary, 30 improvisations for solo piano, released on 1631 Recordings, and swiftly followed by his second Erased Tapes album Tender Symmetry in 2018. Tender Symmetry is a collection of orchestral and vocal works created in response to, and recorded within 7 distinctive and evocative National Trust sites. It's companion work 'Songs for Eveline' arrived in 2019.

In 2021 Price released The Hope of Better Weather  a collection of 2012 piano recordings alongside new reworks by artists including Yann Tiersen, Bill Ryder-Jones, Eluvium_(musician) and Malibu as well as a duet with Peter Gregson (cellist).

The Hope of Better Weather was followed in 2022 by Whitsun, a new album of contemporary compositions centred around the Klavins Una Corda piano.

In the live sphere Michael has performed as a pianist solo as well as with the ‘Michael Price Trio and Ensemble’ at venues such as the Royal Albert Hall, London, Kings Place, London, Union Chapel, London, the Casa da Musica, Porto, Reeperbahn Festival, Hamburg, and the Stadsschouwburg in Leuven.

 Other information 

Price has worked with several music bodies and organisations, including PRS, BASCA and music charity Heart N Soul. In 2015 he was the chair of the BASCA Media Executive Committee and director of the BASCA board.

Solo discography

 Albums 

 EPs 

 Compilations 

 Remixes / reworks 

 Production 

Film and television credits

 Film 

 Television 

 Music editor 

 Other credits 

Awards
 Won: (with David Arnold) Primetime Emmy Award for Outstanding Music Composition for a Miniseries, Movie, or a Special - Sherlock ("His Last Vow")
 Won: (with David Arnold) Music and Sound Award 2013 for Best Original Composition in a Television Programme - Sherlock (Season 2)
 Won: (with David Arnold) Televisual Bulldog Award 2013 for Best Music - Sherlock (Season 2)
 Won: (with David Arnold) 2010 Royal Television Award for Original Title - Sherlock (Season 1)
 Won: MPSE Golden Reel Award 2001 for Music Editor - The Lord of the Rings: The Fellowship of the Ring''

References

External links
 Michael Price official website
 HotHouse Music
 

Alumni of the University of Surrey
English composers
English male composers
Living people
Year of birth missing (living people)
Place of birth missing (living people)
Erased Tapes Records artists